The Ellemann-Jensen doctrine is a Danish idea specifically aimed at promoting small countries' ability to gain influence in the world order. The doctrine is not a written document but rather inspired by the former Danish Foreign Minister Uffe Ellemann-Jensen's term of office in which he promoted the notion that a small country can gain influence by supporting those greater countries that share the same values and ideas, which the small country itself embraces.

Uffe Ellemann-Jensen led the European recognition of the renewed independence of the three  Baltic countries in 1991, when Denmark was the first country to re-establish diplomatic relations with the three countries.

Historical Context 
The doctrine should seen in the context of Danish political history as the official break with the "Spirit of 1864". In 1864, Denmark lost the final war (Second war of Schleswig) in a series of devastating defeats during which she lost three-fourths of her territory. The "Spirit of '64" had as its slogan, "what was lost outwards must be won inwards" and was essentially an isolationist policy preaching a high level of deference towards neighbouring nations and an emphasis on domestic development. Denmark did thus not join any of the European alliances at that time and sought essentially to remain uninvolved in conflicts as they erupted. Military investments, if conducted, were primarily defensive in nature. In effect, it was argued that a country as small as Denmark had no way of affecting the rest of the world.

Following World War I, where Denmark had remained neutral, it was offered larger tracts of German territory by France and the allies, however, unlike the eastern neighbours, it opted for a settlement by plebiscite including rights for the Germans in Denmark and vice versa. It proved partly successful as the Danish-German border remained one of the few borders which a resurgent Germany did not contest.

However, during the course of World War II, when Denmark was invaded, the "Spirit of '64" rose again, this time in the form of a rather quick Danish surrender and a subsequent policy of collaboration. Basically, the view was held that since Denmark stood no chance of defeating the German invaders on their own, they might as well not fight. While this obviously saved Danish lives, it also allowed Germany to occupy the country with fewer troops than otherwise, thus freeing up troops for the assault on France. It is in stark contrast to the heavy opposition to German invasion given by for instance Norway.

The first cracks in the isolationist policy occurred after WWII, when Denmark - fearful of the then Soviet occupation of its Baltic islands - joined NATO. This was further expanded during the so-called "footnote policies" of the 1980s, where the Danish Social Democrats sought a political weakening of the NATO alliance, much like France, through a tactic of inserting footnotes containing reservations or objections into every NATO document that Denmark agreed upon.

However, the true re-entry of Denmark unto the world political scene, occurred under the foreign ministry of Uffe Ellemann-Jensen, where Denmark made a number of bold international moves, the best known being the recognition of the Baltic states as the first country in the world as these claim independence from the Soviet Union and the less known dispatchment of a small number of military advisors to the young Baltic nations. While led by Denmark, this move was quickly joined by the Nordic nations, who then joined Denmark in a successful lobbying campaign within the Western world for a quick recognition of the Baltic states.

The Ellemann-Jensen doctrine is thus, that a small country - like Denmark - can affect world politics through successfully building alliances to promote its foreign policy goals. An unstated implication of this is obviously that a small country should therefore also be willing to adopt and support the goals of its allies in a quid pro quo (something for something) for them supporting its own goals.

Under the following government led by the Danish Social Democrats the Ellemann-Jensen doctrine was carried on, and Denmark did not only dispatch peacekeepers to the Balkans in the 1990s, but also had no qualms about committing them to fight if need be. Denmark also became more vocal in the United Nations, launching - for instance - resolutions against human rights abuses in China.

The culmination of the Ellemann Doctrine, however, came under the former prime minister Anders Fogh Rasmussen, who had succeeded Uffe Ellemann-Jensen as leader of the Liberal party. He deployed Danish troops in the 2003 Iraq war, arguing it was indeed a battle between good and evil. Anders Fogh Rasmussen also became the first Danish prime minister to officially denounce the Danish collaboration policy during the Second World War as wrong, arguing "If every country had done as Denmark (i.e. given up without a fight), the outcome of the war would have been clear."

References

Foreign relations of Denmark
Politics of Denmark
Foreign policy doctrines